Joo Young-dae (born 15 January 1973) is a South Korean para table tennis player. He won two silver medals at the 2016 Summer Paralympics. He is being coached by Choi Kyoung-sik.

He became disabled following a traffic accident in 1993, when he was a sophomore at Gyeongsang National University.

References 

1973 births
Living people
Table tennis players at the 2016 Summer Paralympics
Medalists at the 2016 Summer Paralympics
Medalists at the 2020 Summer Paralympics
South Korean male table tennis players
Paralympic gold medalists for South Korea
Paralympic silver medalists for South Korea
Paralympic table tennis players of South Korea
People from Sacheon
Paralympic medalists in table tennis
Sportspeople from South Gyeongsang Province
Gyeongsang National University alumni
Table tennis players at the 2020 Summer Paralympics